
Gmina Koźminek is a rural gmina (administrative district) in Kalisz County, Greater Poland Voivodeship, in west-central Poland.

Villages
Gmina Koźminek contains the villages and settlements of Agnieszków, Bogdanów, Chodybki, Dąbrowa, Dębsko, Dębsko-Dosinek, Dębsko-Ośrodek, Dębsko-Ostoja, Emilianów, Emilianów-Pośrednik, Emilianów-Zosina, Gać Kaliska, Gać Pawęzowa, Józefina, Koźminek, Krzyżówki, Ksawerów, Marianów, Młynisko, Moskurnia, Murowaniec, Nowy Karolew, Nowy Nakwasin, Osuchów, Osuchów-Parcela, Oszczeklin, Pietrzyków, Przydziałki, Raszawy, Rogal, Słowiki, Smółki, Sokołówka, Stary Karolew, Stary Nakwasin, Tymianek and Złotniki.

Neighbouring gminas
Gmina Koźminek is bordered by the gminas of Ceków-Kolonia, Goszczanów, Lisków, Opatówek and Szczytniki.

References
Polish official population figures 2006

Kozminek
Kalisz County